Jörgen Sundqvist may refer to:

 Jörgen Sundqvist (ice hockey) (born 1982), Swedish ice hockey defenceman 
 Jörgen Sundqvist (alpine skier) (born 1962), Swedish former alpine skier